Song Jun-pyeong (born 29 July 1996) is a South Korean former football defender. After playing at collegiate level for Yonsei University, he turned professional and was signed by Suwon Samsung Bluewings. In 2020, Song retired from professional football due to a recurrent injury. His father is acclaimed actor Song Kang-ho.

References

External links
Profile on Suwon Samsung Bluewings website
 

1996 births
Living people
Association football forwards
South Korean footballers
Suwon Samsung Bluewings players
K League 1 players